Joan R. Najita is an American astronomer and Chief Scientist at the National Optical Astronomy Observatory.

Career

She has been at NOAO since 1998. In 1993 she received her PhD from University of California, Berkeley under supervision of Frank Shu.

She is an expert in star formation and the formation and evolution of planetary systems, in particular the gas in circumstellar disks.

Awards
In 1996, Najita was awarded the Annie Jump Cannon Award in Astronomy.

References

Year of birth missing (living people)
Living people
American women astronomers
American women scientists
Recipients of the Annie J. Cannon Award in Astronomy
University of California, Berkeley alumni
Harvard University alumni
21st-century American women